Private property is a legal designation for the ownership of property by non-governmental legal entities.

Private property may also refer to:

 Private Property (1960 film), an American film starring Kate Manx, Warren Oates and Corey Allen
 Private Property (2006 film), a French-language Belgian film directed by Joachim Lafosse
 Private Property (2022 film), an American film remake of the 1960 film starring Ashley Benson and Shiloh Fernandez

See also
 Property rights (economics)
 Anti-capitalism